The 1998 Trans America Athletic Conference men's basketball tournament (now known as the ASUN men's basketball tournament) was held February 26–28 at the John Kresse Arena at the College of Charleston in Charleston, South Carolina.

In a rematch of the 1997 title match, College of Charleston again defeated  in the championship game, 72–63, to win their second TAAC/Atlantic Sun men's basketball tournament.

The Cougars, therefore, received the TAAC's automatic bid to the 1998 NCAA tournament.

Format
For conference scheduling, the 12 teams in the TAAC were separated into two six-team divisions. However, only the top eight teams in the standings, regardless of division, were invited to participate in the tournament. However, transitioning members Florida Atlantic, Jacksonville State, and Troy State were not eligible.

Southeastern Louisiana departed the TAAC for the Southland Conference prior to the season but were replaced by Troy State, leaving total membership at 12.

Bracket

References

ASUN men's basketball tournament
Tournament
TAAC men's basketball tournament
TAAC men's basketball tournament